Back to Field (Chinese: 向往的生活; pinyin: Xiàngwǎng de shēnghuó) is a Chinese reality show on Hunan TV. The show documents the simplistic lifestyle of living away from the bustling city centers.

Format 
Each season takes place in a different rural part of China. The cast members are only provided with the basic life necessities and have to take care of everything else such as cooking their own meals and building their own furniture. To "buy" different cooking ingredients and other tools, they have to complete certain tasks assigned by the production crew, such as planting and harvesting crops. Different guests join the cast in each episode and help out with the daily chores. The goal of the program is to bring the audience along on a slower pace of life and to illustrate the joys of a simple lifestyle.

Members

Cast

Animals

Episodes

Season 1 
Season 1 was filmed in Huayuan Village, Xinchengzi Town, Miyun District, Beijing, with He Jiong, Huang Lei, and Henry Lau as the main hosts. This show was initially called 一仆二主 or One Servant, Two Masters and the original broadcasting platform for the show was Dragon Television. However, due to unsatisfactory results of the program's investment promotion, Dragon TV planned to intervene in the program's production process, resulting in a disagreement between the producer, Hexin Media, and Dragon TV. Dragon TV finally gave up the broadcasting rights of the program and the producer suspended the recording of the program after the sixth episode. Subsequently, with the strong support of He Jiong, Hunan TV obtained the rights to broadcast the program. The pilot aired on 8 January 2017, and the season premiered on 15 January and concluded on 16 April.

Season 2 
Actor Peng Yuchang joins the permanent cast in season 2. Filming began on 13 March 2018, in Heling Village, Jiuxian Subdistrict, Tonglu County, Hangzhou, Zhejiang. The pilot was broadcast on 13 April 2018, and the season premiered on 20 April 2018, and concluded on 6 July 2018.

Season 3 
Actress Zhang Zifeng joins the permanent cast in season 3, while Henry Lau announced on his personal Weibo that he will be withdrawing from the show and pivoting his focus towards music. In addition to exploring the simplicity and tranquility of the countryside lifestyle, the theme of the show, season 3 added a separate plot line revolving around the research on rural conditions. The project is jointly completed by the program team and experts and scholars from Peking University, Renmin University of China, and Beijing Normal University. The three dimensions of "current situation and advantages," "problems and dilemmas," and "countermeasures and suggestions" was taken as the overarching framework. Filming began on 19 March 2019, in Wengcao Village, Morong Town, Guzhang County, Hunan Province. The pilot aired on 19 April 2019, and the season premiered on 26 April 2019, and concluded on 19 July 2019.

Season 4 
The permanent cast of season 4 remains the same as season 3. Filming began on 26 March 2020, in Manyuan Village, Manleine Village Committee, Menghan Town, Jinghong City, Xishuangbanna, Yunnan. The pilot aired on 1 May 2020, and the season premiered on 8 May 2020, and concluded on 24 July 2020.

Season 5 
Lay Zhang was added to the permanent cast for season 5. Filming began on 18 March 2021 in Bailinzhou Village, Taohuayuan Town, Taoyuan County, Changde, Hunan. The season premiered on 23 April.

Season 6 
The permanent cast of season 6 remains the same as season 5. Filming began on 7 March 2022 in Shayutang Village, Haiwei Town, Changjiang, Hainan. The season premiered on 29 April 2022.

Awards

References 

Chinese game shows
Chinese reality television series
Hunan Television original programming
2017 Chinese television series debuts